, is a Japanese anime television series created and directed by Tensai Okamura and animated by studio Bones. Twenty-five episodes were broadcast on MBS, TBS and their affiliated stations from April to September 2007. The series is set in a world where a spatial anomaly identified as "Heaven's Gate" appeared in South America and was followed by "Hell's Gate" in Tokyo, altering the sky and wreaking havoc on the landscapes. People with special abilities labeled as Contractors emerged shortly afterwards. The series follows agent Hei and his comrades in the Syndicate organization, operating in an vastly altered version of contemporary Tokyo to uncover the mysteries of Hell's Gate.

The series was adapted into two manga series, which were serialized in Kadokawa Shoten's Monthly Asuka and Square Enix's Young Gangan, respectively. A sequel to the anime series, Darker than Black: Gemini of the Meteor, was broadcast for twelve episodes from October to December 2009. In the sequel, Hei trains new Contractor Suo Pavlichenko and searches for his former ally Yin. DVDs of the series included original video animations titled Darker than Black: Gaiden exploring Hei and Yin's relationship between the first and second seasons. In North America, Darker than Black was licensed by Funimation.
 
The series was created by Okamura, who was inspired by ninja and spy stories based on ideas he had after creating Wolf's Rain. In contrast to Wolf's Rain heroic cast, Okamura wanted flawed and violent heroes such as the Contractors. While Okamura penned most of the series' contents, he left freedom to other writers, most notably Shōtarō Suga who takes over the work of main writer in the second half. Critical response to Darker than Black was generally positive for its handling of Hei and the other Contractors who fight each other though there was expressure of confusion in regards to the setting and ending.

Plot

Ten years ago before the events of the series, a spatial anomaly which became known as "Heaven's Gate" appeared in South America. It was followed by the opening of "Hell's Gate" in Tokyo, altering the sky and wreaking havoc on the landscape. At that time, "Contractors", people with special abilities, capable of supernatural feats, emerged. Kept secret from the public, Contractors murder in cold blood and block their emotions with logic and reason. Their abilities are acquired at the cost of their humanity, and their name derives from the requirement to "pay the price" each time their powers are used. Nations and organizations around the world train and use Contractors as spies and assassins, resulting in violent battles for valuable objects and information.

After the 'Heaven's War', the United States loses its position as a superpower to a mysterious organization known as the Syndicate. Darker Than Black follows a Chinese Contractor code-named "Hei" as he undertakes espionage and assassination missions in Tokyo directed by the Syndicate. In his false civilian life, where he is known as shy a student under the alias Li Shenshun, Hei is assisted by Yin, an artificial human known as Doll and Mao, a Contractor trapped in a cat's body and overseen by former police officer Huang. The series has a villain-of-the-week format, with a variety of characters such as a Japanese Public Security Bureau who oversee the activities of dangerous people with supernatural powers.

Early in the series Hei is revealed as a former fighter in the Heaven's War, searching for his missing sister Bai; he believes that a woman known as Amber is responsible for Bai's disappearance after escaping from the Syndicate. Amber leads Evening Primrose, a group of Contractors targeted by the Syndicate who claim they are terrorists. Pandora, another group, investigates Hell's Gate; the Syndicate is using Pandora and its Saturn Ring weapon to attack Hell's Gate and annihilate the Contractors. This creates mayhem as multiple Syndicate agents target Huang who ultimately commits suicide. Hei and Yin meet Amber while Mao escapes from them. Upon meeting Amber, Hei is revealed to be an ordinary human who became able to use Bai's power after his sister placed his body onto his flesh through her powers. When Saturn Ring is activated, all Contractors except Hei are killed. Hei has a vision where he meets Bai and decides to betray the Syndicate. Amber uses her Contract powers to revert time long enough to enable Hei to destroy Saturn Ring, and Hei and Yin escape from the Syndicate.

Production

Darker than Black was first announced in December 2006, and its first trailer was released in March 2007. It was created and directed by Tensai Okamura. Since Darker than Black has an original screenplay, Okamura often considered changing the plot, something impossible with manga adaptations, due to the need for consistency with the source material. Okamura originally wanted the series to be called BK201, a code name, but the anime staff considered it weak and Darker Than Black was suggested by an MBS TV employee.

The idea for Darker Than Black came to Okamura while he was creating the anime Wolf's Rain, and was based on his handling of protagonists. The main characters in Wolf's Rain are heroic, unlike the violent protagonists in Darker than Black; Okamura wanted the latter's characters to be flawed, in contrast to those in Wolf's Rain. Darker than Black was the first anime series created by Okamura, who said that it took him several years. As a child he read mangas about ninjas, spies and superheroes, and was particularly influenced by a Shirato Sampei manga about ninjas which helped young readers learn the art of ninja; "the spirit and the atmosphere of the spy series that rocked my childhood", such as The Fugitive, were other influences on Okamura's series. In particular, Okamura wanted a series of ninja to be centered around modern Tokyo. The handling of the two Gates prominent in the series' world building was inspired by Roadside Picnic, a novel by Arkady and Boris Strugatsky.

Writing
The bi-episodic structure is based on the experience when Okamura worked as storyboarder in the anime Cowboy Bebop. They have space to dig more on the new characters of each new arc. The series compositor of the first half is Okamura himself, leaving a lot freedom to the writers. The second half, since this original show needs to be put into an end, it is Shōtarō Suga handling the role as his first time being a series compositor. The writer team consists of Shinsuke Onishi, Yuichi Nomura, Suga, Kurasumi Sunayama, and Okamura himself. Okamura wrote first two episodes as the first arc. He wrote them in advance to start off the series. Ohnishi was Okamura's acquaintance in previous works, the latter describes him: offering interesting script without speaking a word. Ohnishi is the most Darker than Black spiritual writer. Every episode with detective comedy is handled by him which is Okamura's original wish to make a 1980s-like Japanese detective story. His stories usually contains a clear theme structured by a thematic line and a complementary line.

Nomura is the writer that conceived the character of Amber and was credited at being really good at depicting beauty of humanity with cruelty. Nomura wrote multiple episodes focused on relationships as well as the final parts involving Amber, giving her a tragic ending despite the character staying on Hei's side until her death. Sunayama handles all the gang related stories, including the Hong Kong mafia, and Japanese yakuza. In his story, the desires of the characters are extracted and deferred. In his writing, Nomura finds Hei as funny from time to time, as he is trying to pretend innocent and naive as a Chinese international student while his strength as a spy just overflows. Then Suga, the most important writer in the Darker than Black series, handles high concept and main plot related arcs, with Hei on the spotlight.

The Havoc arc first reveals to audience the possibility that Hei is not a Contractor. And then comes the inside-the-Gate episodes is the first time change really takes place for Hei's character arc after meeting a man who shares the same dreams as him. Suga is the one closest to Okamura's worldview, since they kept doing the throw and catch, he asked Okamura about the settings, and helped him extract what and how he wanted to express. With Suga's control of the last few arcs, take the doll selling as example, the stories starts to converge, and the ending is designed by Suga.

Animation
Character designer Yūji Iwahara inspired Okamura to work on Darker than Black, based on his work on the video game Koudelka and its manga version. The narrative was inspired by Japanese dramas which divide stories into two consecutive episodes. As a result, every story of Darker than Black takes two episodes to finish. Okamura wanted to give his audience comic and dark stories for variety. Actual locations, including Shinjuku and a police station, were photographed to make the series more realistic. According to Iwahara, Hei was the most difficult character to draw; he struggled for a subtle balance when designing the character. Hei's black eyes were smaller, creating a cold impression, later becoming more expressive. Li, his civilian persona, was originally gentle-looking. Iwahara accepted the offer because he was interested in the project, and wanted to do something different after his previous serialized manga. Although he found the character sheets easy to do, he was daunted by the number of characters he had to create.

The team was tasked with depicting super-powered individuals fighting against a Tokyo backdrop, which was complicated. Okamura found early designs unacceptable; until his image of the characters matched Iwahara's, the pictures were redrawn many times. Iwahara found his work on the anime more challenging than his manga, since he had to keep up with staff requests and had little artistic freedom. Takahiro Komori adapted Iwahara's work for animation, retaining the essence of the original designs and making the animators' work easier; Huang's hat and Yutaka Kouno's and Mayu Ootsuka's clothing were changed. Colour designer Nobuko Mizuta was disappointed because much of the series is set at night and the main characters' clothing is generally dark-coloured, but she gave the guest characters brightly-coloured clothes. Komori said that when he draws female characters, he pays special attention to the line connecting her buttocks and legs. The series' first opening scene has a silhouetted nude woman following Hei, which had to be corrected in subsequent episodes. The artist had mixed emotions about sexualizing female characters but in the end decided to sexualize them to appeal to the audience.

Music

The series' soundtrack was composed by Yoko Kanno in 2007. The series uses four pieces of theme music: two opening themes and two ending themes. "Howling" by Abingdon Boys School was used as the opening theme for the first 14 episodes while "Kakusei Heroism (The Hero Without a "Name")" by An Cafe was used as the second opening theme from episodes 15 onwards.  by Rie fu was used as the ending theme for the first 14 episodes while "Dreams" by High and Mighty Color was used as the second ending theme from episodes 15 onwards. The lyrics of "Howling" focus on Hei's characterization with Okamura commenting that parts of it delve into elements the character briefly saw.
 
The soundtrack has 20 tracks, including the opening and closing themes performed by Abingdon Boys School and Rie fu. Other non-instrumental songs were written by Tim Jensen and performed by Mai Yamane (tracks eight and 10) and James Wendt (tracks 14 and 19). It peaked at number 57 on the Oricon albums chart. Tensai Okamura wanted 1970s-type folk music which would convey the impression of darkness. 

When approached by Okamura, Kanno recalled being given ideas about a detective series to give her music a distinctive style. When she began composing the soundtrack, she did not have a scenario or setting in mind when she met Okamura again. Some of the background music is typical Kanno as heard in Ghost in the Shell: Stand Alone Complex, but other tracks are livelier; she wanted to write glamorous songs. Kanno cited sophisticated French films as inspiring the music of Darker than Black, wanting it to embody the series' cold characters; Latin music was another influence, and she appreciated sound director Kazuhiro Wakabayashi's assistance with the soundtrack.

Release

First season

Darker than Black was conceived by Tensai Okamura and produced by Bones and Aniplex. The series was broadcast on MBS and TBS from April 6 to September 28, 2007. The series was also streamed on Nifty during its broadcast run. Aniplex collected the episodes on nine DVD sets which were released from July 25, 2007, to March 26, 2008. The ninth and final set included an additional episode, which explored the characters' romantic relationships. A Blu-ray box set, which included a guidebook and several unreleased musical tracks not available on the original soundtrack, was released in Japan on September 30, 2009.

On July 1, 2007, Funimation announced at Anime Expo that they had licensed the series. Funimation began streaming the series, with an English dub, in September 2008. They collected the series on six DVD sets, which were released from November 25, 2008, to August 11, 2009. Darker Than Black began airing on the Funimation Channel in September 2010. Funimation released the season on Blu-ray on May 12, 2015. In January 2016, the company said that their rights to the series had expired. Manga Entertainment released the series in the United Kingdom as a compilation, and Madman Entertainment licensed it in Australia.

Second season

A second season, was broadcast on MBS and TBS from October 9 to December 25, 2009. Aniplex collected the episodes in nine DVD/Blu-ray sets, which were released from December 23, 2009, to July 21, 2010.

On July 2, 2010, Funimation announced at Anime Expo that they had licensed the second season. Funimation released the series on DVD and Blu-ray on November 8, 2011. Their rights to the second season expired in 2018. Manga Entertainment released the series in the United Kingdom as a compilation, and Madman Entertainment licensed it in Australia.

Original video animation

A four-episode original video animation (OVA), was included on the second, fourth, sixth and eighth collected Blu-ray and DVD sets of Darker than Black: Gemini of the Meteor released from January 27 to July 21, 2010. The OVAs are set in the time between the two seasons. Hei and Yin have left Tokyo and are on the run from the Syndicate. They are attacked by Contractors, and Hei notices Yin's alter ego Izanami (who would bring about the end of the world). Yin asks Hei to kill her; the Contractor cannot, and they are caught up in an explosion. Hei becomes depressed after Yin's apparent death; a CIA agent tells him that Yin is still alive, setting up the events of Gemini of Meteor. The closing theme is "Darker Than Black" by Yasushi Ishii. For the English-language release, the OVAs were included in the Gemini of the Meteor compilation.

Related media

A manga adaptation, illustrated by Nokiya, was serialized in Kadokawa Shoten's shōjo manga magazine Monthly Asuka from March 24 to November 24, 2007. Its chapters were collected in two tankōbon volumes on August 8, 2007, and January 26, 2008, respectively. The series was licensed for English release in North America by Yen Press, which released both volumes in an omnibus edition on June 15, 2010.

A second manga adaptation,  illustrated by Yuji Iwahara, the anime series' character designer, was serialized in Square Enix's seinen manga magazine Young Gangan from May 15, 2009, to January 21, 2011. The manga is set one year after the events of season one, and focuses on Hei on a mission to stop one Contractor from giving civilians the chance to become like him. Square Enix collected its chapters in four tankōbon volumes which were released from October 24, 2009, to March 25, 2011.

The characters Hei and Suo also appear in Heroes Phantasia, a 2012 role-playing game by 	Witchcraft.

Reception
The series was a jury recommendation in the "Animation Division/Long Animation" category of the 2007 Japan Media Arts Festival. At the 2008 Society for the Promotion of Japanese Animation awards, Hei was the second "best male anime character"; Kazuhiro Wakabayashi was the best casting director, Darker than Black was the second-best television series, with the second-best original score, and Okamura placed fifth in the best-director category. Hei is a popular character in Japan, finishing seventh in the "Best Male Character" category of Animages 2010 Anime Grand Prix. In a Newtype poll, he was the 10th-most-popular male anime character from the 2000s. The home-media releases of both seasons were successful in Japan, including the Blu-ray box. In the United Kingdom, the series was nominated for the 2009 NEO Award for Best Anime. It was the winner of the "Best Original Anime" award by Japanese magazine GoGoplex. Japanator named Darker than Black one of best anime of the 2000s, calling it a "beautifully animated show by BONES is sure to please anyone looking for a dark and serious show".

Critical response to the series was generally positive. An Anime News Network reviewer, Theron Martin, wrote that although the setting was unclear, its narrative and cast were appealing. Reviewers have pointed out that the fight scenes and the handling of the Contractors contrasted with the more-lighthearted parts of the narrative. The series' final episodes received mixed reviews; Hei's character arc and his relationship with Amber and Yin were praised, but the ending was considered rushed. According to an Active Anime reviewer, most of the characters were generally three-dimensional and the narrative was compelling. In the book Magic as Metaphor in Anime: A Critical Study, Darker than Black is a mixture of supernatural powers and technology with "arguably unmatched poignance"; the Contractors, on the other hand, are unemotional. A retrospective Fandom Post reviewer said that the series subverted viewer expectations because it aired in the same time slot as the popular Code Geass with appealing characters and fight scenes. Fans were disappointed by the ending's lack of resolution, to which character designer Iwahara responded with his manga Dimension W. An AnimeNation reviewer said that the series was less popular in Japan than the West, and the Japanese audience was surprised by a sequel. The series has been compared to X-Men comics for its handling of supernatural fighters, and to Cowboy Bebop for Hei's enigmatic characterization and stylishness.

The series' Japanese and English voice acting was praised, although Fandom Post suggested that deliveries were better executed in later episodes, while DVDTalk suggested the English dub for better immersion into the narrative. Tomoko Kawakami's performance as Amber, the actress' final work before her death, was called "solid"; Jason Liebrecht's Hei was described as "a schizophrenic variation" of Syaoran from Tsubasa: Reservoir Chronicle. Anime News Network said that the Japanese and English voice actors synched well with the video. "Howling" by Abingdon Boys School and "Tsukiakari" by Rie fu were good contrasting themes in the series. The second opening theme, "Kakusei Heroism" by An Cafe, was praised; "Dreams" by High and Mighty Color was said to lack the appeal of the first ending, "Tsukiaraki". Koinya preferred "Kakusei Heroism ~The Hero Without A Name~" over "Howling" despite enjoying both themes. Yoko Kanno's score was described as "unintrusive" by Ain't it Cool News for the variety of instruments used for background music while Anime News Network commented it "achieve[d] a sort of synergy, pouring their considerable skills into a sequence of silent beauty and power".

In the two manga, Hei played in the other manga spin-off by Nokiya was criticized by MangaLife as "flat".

Notes

References

External links

 Official homepage 
 Official homepage (MBS) 
 Animax's official homepage 
 

Darker than Black
2007 anime television series debuts
2008 anime OVAs
2009 anime television series debuts
Anime with original screenplays
Aniplex
Bones (studio)
Discrimination in fiction
Espionage in anime and manga
Fiction about urban legends
Funimation
Kadokawa Shoten manga
Mainichi Broadcasting System original programming
Mystery anime and manga
Occult detective anime and manga
Science fiction anime and manga
Shōjo manga
Supernatural thriller anime and manga
TBS Television (Japan) original programming
Yen Press titles